David Burney is a public architect and educator. He was born in Liverpool, England and educated at Edinburgh College of Art and The Bartlett Faculty of the Built Environment of University College London (UCL). He is the Academic Coordinator of Urban Placemaking and Management at Pratt Institute and serves as a commissioner at the New York City Department of City Planning. He has lived in New York since 1982.

Education and career 
Mr. Burney is a fellow of the American Institute of Architects (2008), and Academic Coordinator and Associate Professor of the Graduate Center for Planning of Pratt Institute School of Architecture.
He is Chair of the Board of Center for Active Design, a nonprofit organization supports public health by increasing opportunities for physical activity and healthy eating through the design of the built environment, established in 2012 as a key initiatives from New York City Mayor Michael Bloomberg’s Obesity Taskforce. Mr. Burney often appeared before NYC's Public Design Commission, (previously The Municipal Art Commission).

Mr. Burney is the first architect to have served as Commissioner of the Department of Design and Construction ("DDC"), from 2004 to 2014, the entity charged with managing capital projects for multiple city agencies, including the NYC Departments of Transportation and Environmental Protection, and borough-wide cultural institutions, such as libraries, courthouses, fire stations, and police precincts, and museums. Appointed by then-mayor Michael Bloomberg, Mr. Burney launched a City-wide initiative in 2006, the Design + Construction Excellence ("D+CE"), to raise the quality of design and construction of public realm projects throughout New York City. To accomplish the goal, Mr. Burney innovated a new peer review process, and of his accomplishments, his colleagues have said that he "...changed many places from an eyesore to something that residents can be proud of."   He authored a book about civic building and infrastructure works achieved under his leadership at DDC,  We Build the City: New York City's Design + Construction Excellence Program,(2014), which includes a foreword by Mayor Bloomberg.

Prior to leading DDC, Mr. Burney was Director of Design and Capital Improvement of the New York City Housing Authority ("NYCHA") from 1990 to 2003. While at NYCHA, Mr. Burney oversaw the construction and renovation of 100 community center facilities, often attached to affordable housing developments. Under the leadership of Mr. Burney, NYCHA was awarded a Special Commendation Award from the Cooper Hewitt, Smithsonian Design Museum (2002). Burney has produce influential publications, including The “Active Design Guidelines” report, in collaboration with the NYC AIA.

Mr. Burney moved to New York in 1982. Mr. Burney contributed to various architectures projects, including Zeckendorf Towers on Union Square and the Rose Building at Lincoln Center in Manhattan while practicing at the private firm of Davis Brody & Associates, until 1990, the same year the firm merged with Bond Ryder & Associates to become Davis Brody Bond, and J. Max Bond, Jr. became a partner.

Professional Recognition 
Mr. Burney has received professional recognition from the American Institute of Architects ("AIA") NYC Chapter Public Architecture Award (1996), Sloane Public Service Award (2003), Center for Architecture Award (2006), NY State Chapter AIA Presidents' Award's (2007), the American Institute of Architects Thomas Jefferson Award for Public Architecture (2011), and the New York City Chapter of the AIA Public Service Award (2012).

Completed projects 
 NYCHA Saratoga Avenue Community Center, Brownsville, Brooklyn, N.Y. ; Architect : George Ranalli, Architect.
 FDNY Engine 277, Ladder 112 Bushwick, N.Y. ;   Architect : STV Group, Inc.
 FDNYRescue Company 3, Bronx, N.Y. ;  Architect : Polshek Partnership
 Queens Library, Queens, N.Y. ; Architect : Marble Fairbanks
 Renovation of Central Park Precinct Station House Manhattan, N.Y.
 New York City Hall Renovation. Manhattan, N.Y.
 Brooklyn Children's Museum, Brooklyn, N.Y.  ; Architect : Rafael Viñoly.
 Children's Library Discovery Center, in Jamaica, Queens, New York.

Projects in progress 
 121 Precinct Station, Staten Island, N.Y.  Architect: Rafael Viñoly.

References 

21st-century American architects
Living people
20th-century American architects
Fellows of the American Institute of Architects
Architects from Liverpool
English emigrants to the United States
Alumni of the University of Edinburgh
Alumni of University College London
Pratt Institute faculty
Year of birth missing (living people)